Diplocheilichthys is a genus of cyprinid fish consisting of two species, both of which are endemic to Indonesia.

Species
 Diplocheilichthys jentinkii (Popta, 1904)
 Diplocheilichthys pleurotaenia (Bleeker, 1855)

References

 

Cyprinidae genera
Cyprinid fish of Asia
Fish of Indonesia